"Mahalo" is the Hawaiian word for "thank you".

Mahalo may also refer to:

 mahalo.com, a web directory and question-and-answer site
 Mahalo Air, airline 
 Waai! Mahalo, a manga magazine